Rabo Kabara Saminou Gado (born 23 May 1986 in Agadez) is a Nigerien footballer who for FUS Rabat. He is also the member of Niger national team.

Career 
Saminou began his career in Niger with Sahel SC and scored his only goal in SuperCup final 2006 against AS-FNIS. After three years with the first team of Sahel SC in the Championnat national de première division joined in January 2007 to Nigerian top club Enyimba International F.C. He played in his three years 23 games for Enyimba International F.C. and signed in January 2010 for Cotonsport Garoua.
He is right-footed, 182 cm tall, and has 79 kg.

International career

Saminou has made several appearances for the Niger national football team, making his debut in 2006.

References 

1986 births
Living people
Nigerien footballers
Niger international footballers
Expatriate footballers in Cameroon
Sahel SC players
Association football goalkeepers
Coton Sport FC de Garoua players
Nigerien expatriate sportspeople in Nigeria
People from Agadez
Nigerien expatriate sportspeople in Cameroon
Enyimba F.C. players
Expatriate footballers in Nigeria
2011 African Nations Championship players
2012 Africa Cup of Nations players
2013 Africa Cup of Nations players
Niger A' international footballers